The 325th Security Division (German: 325. Sicherungs-Division) was a German military formation that operated in German-occupied France during World War II.

Operational history
It was established in August 1942 under the command of Generalmajor Walter Brehmer, who was succeeded in Mai 1943 by Lieutenant General Hans Freiherr von Boineburg-Lengsfeld. The 325th Security Division was responsible for the defense of Paris and its surrounding area.

Division commander von Boineburg-Lengsfeld, simultaneously Commandant of Greater Paris, supported military governor of France Carl-Heinrich von Stülpnagel in the anti-Hitler 20 July plot. On 20 July 1944, Stülpnagel was informed by Stauffenberg's cousin, who had received a telephone call from Stauffenberg, that Hitler was dead and that the coup was in progress. Stülpnagel then ordered the arrest of all 1,200 SS personnel in the city. The 325th's Security Regiment 1 carried out the task and imprisoned them in Fresnes Prison and Fort de l'Est. Higher SS and Police Leader in France Carl Oberg and other senior SS and Gestapo officers were detained in the Hotel Continental, pending their planned execution. The coup attempt began to unravel that night after it was known that Hitler was in fact alive, and the SS men were ordered released.

The 325th Security Division surrendered to Allied forces during the Liberation of Paris after sustaining around 3,200 men in losses, and was formally disbanded shortly thereafter. It was the only Security Division to serve on the European Western Front.

Organisation 
The division included the following units.

1st Security Regiment
5th Security Regiment
6th Security Regiment
190th Security Regiment
325th Fusiliers Company
325th Engineer Company
325th Artillery Regiment
325th Tank Destroyer Company
325th Signal Company
325th Divisional Supply Group

Notes

References 
 

Military units and formations established in 1943
Military units and formations disestablished in 1944
Security divisions of Germany during World War II